John Pass (born 1947 in Sheffield, England) is a Canadian poet. He has lived in Canada since 1953, and was educated at the University of British Columbia.

He has published 21 books of poetry since 1971. His book Stumbling in the Bloom won the 2006 Governor General's Award for English poetry. His most recent book "crawlspace" (Harbour Publishing, 2011) won the Dorothy Livesay Prize (BC Best Book Award in Poetry) in 2012.

Pass taught English at Capilano University from 1975 to 2007. He lives on BC's Sunshine Coast near Sakinaw Lake with his wife, poet, essayist and novelist Theresa Kishkan

Four of his books of poetry  form a linked quartet under the overall title, "At Large":
 The Hour's Acropolis (Harbour Publishing, 1991)
 Radical Innocence (Harbour Publishing, 1994)
 Water Stair (Oolichan Books, 2000)
 Stumbling in the Bloom (Oolichan Books, 2005)

Works

 Taking Place, 1971
 The Kenojuak Prints, 1973
 AIR 18, 1973 (ISSN 0044-6947)
 Port of Entry, 1975
 Love's Confidence, 1976
 Blossom: An Accompaniment, 1978
 There Go the Cars, 1979
 An Arbitrary Dictionary, 1984
 Rugosa, 1991 
 The Hour's Acropolis, 1991 shortlisted for the 1993 Dorothy Livesay Poetry Prize
 Radical Innocence, 1994
 Mud Bottom, 1996
 Water Stair, 2000 shortlisted for the 2000 Governor General's Literary Award for Poetry and for the 2001 Dorothy Livesay Poetry Prize
 nowrite.doc, 2004
 Twinned Towers, 2005
 Stumbling in the Bloom, 2005 winner of the 2006 Governor General's Literary Award for Poetry
 Self Storage, 2011
 crawlspace, 2011 winner of the 2012 Dorothy Livesay Prize
 Forecast (Selected Early Poems 1970 - 1990), 2015
  "This Was the River", 2019,
  "Vetrna zvonkohra" (Wind Chime) Jiri Mesic trans. 2020, protimluv, Ostrava, Czech Republic

Notes

1947 births
20th-century Canadian poets
Canadian male poets
English emigrants to Canada
Writers from British Columbia
Living people
Governor General's Award-winning poets
Academic staff of Capilano University
20th-century Canadian male writers